The Union Pacific Railroad Complex in Evanston, Wyoming, was built to serve the Union Pacific Railroad main line running through Evanston. The complex's brick buildings were built in 1912–13, with frame buildings spanning the period from 1871 to the 1920s. The complex features a roundhouse with 27 stalls built during the 1912 improvement phase, replacing an earlier roundhouse built in 1871. The complex was the chief service point on the UP main line between Ogden, Utah, and Green River, Wyoming.

Five brick structures remain: the roundhouse, machine shop, gas building, storehouse and the mineral building. Five frame buildings include an office, a woodworking shop and a company store.

The maintenance depot was closed and transferred to Green River in 1927. The Evanston complex became the Union Pacific Reclamation Plant, where rolling stock received heavy overhaul. It was the largest employer in Evanston, employing more than 300. The Union Pacific deeded the complex to Evanston in 1974. An overhaul facility for railcars reopened the same year. Starting as the Wyoming Railcar Company, the operation was absorbed by the Lithcote Company, which was in turn acquired by the Union Tank Car Company. The Union Tank Car Company moved out of the complex in 1998. The roundhouse complex is being restored by the Evanston Renewal Agency.

The Union Pacific Railroad Complex was listed on the National Register of Historic Places in 1985.

References

External links
 Union Pacific Railroad Complex at the Wyoming State Historic Preservation Office

Historic districts on the National Register of Historic Places in Wyoming
National Register of Historic Places in Uinta County, Wyoming
Properties of the Union Pacific Railroad
Railroad roundhouses in Wyoming
Evanston
Railway roundhouses on the National Register of Historic Places
Railway buildings and structures on the National Register of Historic Places in Wyoming
Industrial buildings and structures on the National Register of Historic Places in Wyoming
Evanston, Wyoming